The Nordic Indoor Athletics Match is an annual indoor track and field competition between athletes from the Nordic countries, organised by Nordic Athletics. Established in 2011, it marked a return to regular indoor competition between Denmark, Finland, Iceland, Norway and Sweden, following on from the short-lived Nordic Indoor Athletics Championships in the late 1980s.

The first three editions were contested between Finland, Norway and Sweden only. Hosting duties are shared between the three nations on a yearly rotational basis. The one-day event is typically held on a Saturday in February. The match features a men's and a women's international team competition, referred to as Nordenkampen, where individuals score points based on their placing in the events. Denmark first entered the team competition in 2014 and since 2015 Danish and Icelandic athletes form a combined team against the more competitive Finnish, Swedish and Norwegian teams.

Editions

References

Editions
Competition Venues. Nordic Athletics. Retrieved 2020-02-12.

 
Nordic Athletics competitions
Indoor track and field competitions
Recurring sporting events established in 2011
February sporting events